Joyce Carol Thomas (May 25, 1938 – August 13, 2016) was an African-American poet, playwright, motivational speaker, and author of more than 30 children's books.

Background
Thomas was born in Ponca City, Oklahoma, the fifth of nine children in a family of cotton pickers. In 1948 they moved to Tracy, California, to pick vegetables. She learned Spanish from Mexican migrant workers and earned a B.A. in Spanish from San Jose State University. She took night classes in education at Stanford University, while raising four children, and received the master's degree in 1967.

Literary awards
For her 1982 novel Marked by Fire, Thomas won a National Book Award in category Children's Fiction (paperback)
and an American Book Award.
Thomas has been one of three to five finalists for the Coretta Scott King Award thrice, in 1984 for Bright Shadow, in 1994 for Brown Honey in Broomwheat Tea, and in 2009 for The Blacker the Berry. Part of the American Library Association program, the King Award annually recognizes the "most distinguished portrayal of African American experience in literature for children or teens".
She also received a New York Times Outstanding Book of the Year Award and an Outstanding Woman of the 20th Century Award.

Personal life
Thomas resided in Berkeley, California. She died on August 13, 2016, at the age of 78.

Notes

References

External links

 
Write TV Public Television Interview with Joyce Carol Thomas
 

1938 births
2016 deaths
People from Ponca City, Oklahoma
Writers from Berkeley, California
20th-century American dramatists and playwrights
American children's writers
National Book Award for Young People's Literature winners
Writers from Oklahoma
American Book Award winners